The 2016 United States Senate election in North Carolina was held November 8, 2016 to elect a member of the United States Senate to represent the State of North Carolina, concurrently with the 2016 U.S. presidential election, as well as other elections to the United States Senate in other states and elections to the United States House of Representatives and various state and local elections. Primary elections were held March 15.

Incumbent Republican Senator Richard Burr won re-election to a third term in office against Democratic former State Representative Deborah K. Ross and Libertarian Sean Haugh.

Republican primary 
There had been speculation that Burr might retire, but he said in September 2014 that he was "planning" on running and reaffirmed this in January 2015.  If Burr had retired, the seat was expected to draw significant interest, with potential Republican candidates including U.S. Representatives George Holding, Mark Meadows, and Robert Pittenger, Labor Commissioner Cherie K. Berry, Lieutenant Governor Dan Forest, Agriculture Commissioner Steve Troxler, State Senator Philip E. Berger, and former Ambassador to Denmark James P. Cain.

Candidates

Declared 
 Greg Brannon, physician, Tea Party activist and candidate for the U.S. Senate in 2014
 Richard Burr, incumbent U.S. Senator
 Larry Holmquist, businessman and Tea Party activist
 Paul Wright, former Superior Court Judge, candidate for Governor in 2012 and nominee for NC-04 in 2014

Declined 
 Mark Meadows, U.S. Representative (running for re-election)

Polling

Results

Democratic primary

Candidates

Declared 
 Kevin Griffin, businessman
 Ernest Reeves, retired U.S. Army captain, candidate for the U.S. Senate in 2014 and candidate for Mayor of Greenville in 2015
 Chris Rey, Mayor of Spring Lake
 Deborah K. Ross, former state representative

Declined 
 Dan Blue, Minority Leader of the North Carolina Senate and candidate for the U.S. Senate in 2002
 Roy Cooper, North Carolina Attorney General (running for Governor)
 Janet Cowell, North Carolina State Treasurer
 Cal Cunningham, former state senator and candidate for the U.S. Senate in 2010
 Joel Ford, state senator
 Anthony Foxx, United States Secretary of Transportation and former Mayor of Charlotte
 Kay Hagan, former U.S. Senator
 Duane Hall, state representative
 Larry Hall, Minority Leader of the North Carolina House of Representatives
 Jeff Jackson, state senator
 Allen Joines, Mayor of Winston-Salem (running for re-election)
 Grier Martin, state representative
 Nancy McFarlane, Independent Mayor of Raleigh
 Mike McIntyre, former U.S. Representative
 Charles Meeker, former Mayor of Raleigh (running for Labor Commissioner)
 Brad Miller, former U.S. Representative
 Thomas W. Ross, outgoing President of the University of North Carolina system
 Heath Shuler, former U.S. Representative
 Josh Stein, State Senator (running for Attorney General)
 Allen M. Thomas, Mayor of Greenville
 Beth Wood, State Auditor (running for re-election)

Polling

Results

Libertarian primary

Candidates

Declared 
 Sean Haugh, pizza delivery man and nominee for the U.S. Senate in 2002 and 2014

General election

Candidates 
 Richard Burr (R), incumbent U.S. Senator
 Deborah K. Ross (D), former state representative
 Sean Haugh (L), pizza delivery man and nominee for the U.S. Senate in 2002 and 2014

Debates

Endorsements

Predictions

Polling

With Burr

With Berger

Results

See also 
 United States Senate elections, 2016

References

External links 
Official campaign websites (Archived)
 Richard Burr (R) for Senate
 Deborah Ross (D) for Senate
 Sean Haugh (L) for Senate

North Carolina
2016
United States Senate